Dorcatherium is an extinct genus of tragulid ruminant which existed in Europe, East Africa and the Siwaliks during the Miocene and Pliocene.

References

Chevrotains
Miocene even-toed ungulates
Pliocene even-toed ungulates
Cenozoic mammals of Africa
Cenozoic mammals of Asia
Cenozoic mammals of Europe
Miocene genus first appearances
Pliocene extinctions
Fossil taxa described in 1833
Prehistoric even-toed ungulate genera